Antoine-Jean Gros (16 March 177125 June 1835) was a French painter of historical subjects. He was given the title of Baron Gros in 1824.

Gros studied under Jacques-Louis David in Paris and began an independent artistic career during the French Revolution. Forced to leave France, Gros moved to Genoa. His portrait of the French commander Napoleon Bonaparte at the Battle of Arcole (1796) brought Gros to public attention and gained the patronage of Napoleon.

After traveling with Napoleon's army for several years, he returned to Paris in 1799. In addition to producing several large paintings of battles and other events in Napoleon's life, Gros was a successful portraitist.

Early life and training

Born in Paris, Gros began to learn to draw at the age of six from his father, Jean-Antoine Gros, who was a miniature painter, and showed himself as a gifted artist. His mother, Pierrette-Madeleine-Cécile Durand, was also a painter. Towards the close of 1785, Gros, by his own choice, entered the studio of Jacques-Louis David, which he frequented assiduously, continuing at the same time to follow the classes of the Collège Mazarin.

The death of his father, whose circumstances had been embarrassed by the French Revolution, threw Gros upon his own resources in 1791. He now devoted himself wholly to his profession, and he competed (unsuccessfully) in 1792 for the grand prix. Around this time, however, on the recommendation of the École des Beaux Arts, he painted portraits of the members of the National Convention, but as the Revolution developed, Gros left France in 1793 for Italy.

Genoa and Bonaparte
 
Gros supported himself in Genoa as a portraitist. He visited Florence, and returned to Genoa where he met Joséphine de Beauharnais. Following her to Milan, Gros was well received by her husband, Napoleon Bonaparte.

After Gros painted the scene, Bonaparte at the pont d'Arcole, Bonaparte gave him the post of inspecteur aux revues, which allowed Gros to follow the army. In 1797, Gros was charged with selecting the spoils for the Louvre.

Paris
 
In 1799, Gros left Genoa and made his way to Paris. In the beginning of 1801, he took up his quarters in the Capucins. His study for the painting of the Battle of Nazareth, now in the Musée d'Arts de Nantes,  gained the prize offered in 1802 by the consuls, but the project was not carried out, owing, it is said, to Napoleon's jealousy of Jean-Andoche Junot, the general in the painting.  Gros was commissioned to paint Bonaparte Visiting the Plague Victims of Jaffa, which is now in the Louvre. This was followed in 1806 by Gros's Bataille d’Aboukir, 25 Juillet 1799 (Joachim Murat at the Battle of Abukir) now at Versailles; and in 1808 by his Napoléon sur le champ de bataille d'Eylau, le 9 février 1807 (Napoleon at the battlefield after the Battle of Eylau) now in the Louvre.

Salon of 1804
   
At the Salon of 1804, Gros debuted his painting Bonaparte Visiting the Plague Victims of Jaffa. The painting launched his career as a successful painter. It depicts Bonaparte in Jaffa visiting soldiers infected with the bubonic plague. He is portrayed reaching out to one of the sick, unfazed by the illness. According to P. Jill Morse, Napoleon commissioned Gros to paint the scene to neutralize British propaganda. The propaganda focused on two episodes of the Egyptian campaign (1798-1800). First when he ordered the massacre of Turkish prisoners. Second, when he ordered the death by poison of French soldiers suffering from the plague. The painting showed a compassionate Napoleon visiting the sick at the plague hospital. Morse adds that Gros was probably using the disease as a metaphor for the vanity of Napoleon and his First Empire.

While Bonaparte did actually visit the pesthouse, later, as his army prepared to withdraw from Syria, he ordered the poisoning (with laudanum) of about fifty of his plague-infected men.

Later life and death

In 1810, his Madrid and Napoleon at the Pyramids (Versailles) show that Napoleon had deserted him. His Francis I and Charles V, 1812 (Louvre), had considerable success.

Fame
Gros was made a member of the Legion of Honour on 22 October 1808 by Napoleon, after the Salon of 1808, where he had exhibited the Battle of Eylau. Gros had many pupils and gained considerably more when David left Paris in 1815.

Under the Bourbon Restoration, Gros became a member of the Académie des Beaux-Arts, a professor at the École des Beaux-Arts, and a member of the Order of Saint Michael.  He was granted the title of baron in 1824 by King Charles X of France.

Gros inspired Eugène Delacroix, especially with his work in lithography. The two both worked in the same time period, and both did portraits of Napoleon. However, at one point, Gros had referred to Delacroix's Chios and Missolonghi as "a massacre of art".

G. Dargenty produced a book on the subject titled: Les Artistes célèbres. Le Bon Gros (1887).

M. Delcluze gave a brief notice of his life in Louis David et son temps ("Louis David and his times"), and Julius Meyer's Geschichte der modernen französischen Malerei ("History of Modern French Painting") contains what Britannica cites as an excellent criticism on his works.

Iconography

See also
 Félix Louis Leullier
 Napoleon legacy and memory

Notes

References
 Chu, Petra ten-Doesschate. (2006). Nineteenth-Century European Art. Upper Saddle River, New Jersey: Prentice Hall. pp. 126–127.

External links

 Antoine-Jean Gros – The J. Paul Getty Museum website
 Paintings by Antoine-Jean Gros
 Histoire de la vie et de la mort du baron Gros, le grand peintre, by J. Tripier Le Franc, 1880; includes an annotated list of the students of Gros and a chronological catalogue of known works.

1771 births
1835 deaths
French neoclassical painters
18th-century French painters
French male painters
19th-century French painters
19th-century painters of historical subjects
Artists from Paris
Artists who committed suicide
Painters who committed suicide
Barons of France
Burials at Père Lachaise Cemetery
Members of the Académie des beaux-arts
Orientalist painters
Pupils of Jacques-Louis David
01
Suicides by drowning in France
University of Paris alumni
1830s suicides
18th-century French male artists